Waldegrave Islands Conservation Park is a protected area located on the following islands within the Investigator Group in South Australia: the Waldegrave Island, Little Waldegrave Island and the Watchers (collectively known as the Waldegrave Islands in some sources).  

The land under protection was first declared in 1967 as fauna conservation reserve under the Crown Lands Act 1929-1966, and was re-proclaimed in 1972 under the National Parks and Wildlife Act 1972 to 'conserve Cape Barren geese (Cereopsis novaehollandiae) breeding habitat and Australian sea lion haul-out areas'.

In 1980, the conservation park was described as follows:
As two uninhabited offshore islands, this reserve is largely free of human interference and as such is an important breeding ground for such uncommon bird species as cape barren geese and white-breasted sea-eagles. Also present are ospreys, mutton birds, black tiger snakes and Rattus fuscipes…

 Two offshore islands covered with a largely introduced flora of sage brush and boxthorn over a grass understorey. Only the coastal fringes retain a predominantly native vegetation of nitrebush and saltbush…
 
Though exhibiting a predominantly introduced flora, the Island is uninhabited and free of introduced terrestrial predators. 

The conservation park is classified as an International Union for Conservation of Nature Category Ia protected area.  In 1980, it was listed on the now-defunct Register of the National Estate.

References

External links
 Waldegrave Islands Conservation Park webpage on protected planet

Conservation parks of South Australia
Protected areas established in 1967
1967 establishments in Australia
Great Australian Bight
South Australian places listed on the defunct Register of the National Estate